Maulana Ubaidur Rahman Zia was a Pakistani Islamic scholar who served as the Vice Chairman of the All Pakistan Ulema Council and president of Tehreek e Ahyaa e Sunnat Pakistan. He died on 27 May 2020.

References

Pakistani politicians
Pakistani Islamic religious leaders
Place of death missing
Place of birth missing
Pakistani Sunni Muslim scholars of Islam
2020 deaths
Year of birth missing